Volleyball was contested at the 2011 Summer Universiade from August 12 to August 22 at the Shenzhen Gym and surrounding venues in Shenzhen, China.

Medal summary

Medal table

Events

Men

The men's tournament took place on 12–17 August and 19–22 August. 22 teams participated in the men's tournament.

Teams

Pool A
 
 
 
 
 

Pool B
 
 
 
 
 

Pool C
 
 
 
 
 

Pool D

Women

The women's tournament took place on 14–16 August and 18–21 August. 16 teams participated in the women's tournament.

Teams

Pool A
 
 
 
 

Pool B
 
 
 

Pool C
 
 
 
 

Pool D

References

 
2011 Summer Universiade events
Volleyball at the Summer Universiade
2011 in volleyball